The 1997 Munster Senior Hurling Championship Final (sponsored by Guinness) was a hurling match played on Sunday 6 July 1997 at Páirc Uí Chaoimh, Cork. It was contested by Clare and Tipperary. Clare captained by Anthony Daly and managed by Ger Loughnane claimed the title beating Tipperary on a scoreline of 1-18 to 0-18. 
The match was shown live in Ireland as part of the Sunday Game live on RTÉ Two.	

The win was the first for Clare over Tipperary in a Munster final.
Both teams would go on to contest the 1997 All-Ireland Final, two months later, a game which was also won by Clare on a 2-13 to 0-20 scoreline.

References

See also
 Clare–Tipperary hurling rivalry

Munster
Munster Senior Hurling Championship Finals
Clare county hurling team matches
Tipperary county hurling team matches